Enschede Kennispark is a railway station in Enschede, the Netherlands. The station was opened on 22 November 1996 and is located on the Zutphen–Glanerbeek railway. The train services are operated by Nederlandse Spoorwegen.

The station is directly next to the home stadium of FC Twente, de Grolsch Veste. The station is also used by university students, as it lies close to the campus of University of Twente.

The station was originally called Enschede Drienerlo, named after the former Drienerlo estate, until it was renamed Enschede Kennispark on 13 December 2015. This is to reflect the redevelopment of the area around the station into a science park.

Train services

Bus services

External links
NS website 
Dutch Public Transport journey planner

References

Railway stations in Overijssel
Railway stations opened in 1996
Railway stations on the Staatslijn D
Buildings and structures in Enschede